North Macedonia took part in the Junior Eurovision Song Contest 2021 in Paris, France. The national broadcaster, Macedonian Radio Television (MRT), is responsible for the country's participation in the contest. MRT selected four singers from the television show  to represent North Macedonia with the song "Green Forces".

The country returned to the contest after an absence of one year due to the COVID-19 pandemic.

Background

North Macedonia continued to participate in the contest, but the country withdrew in 2020 due to the COVID-19 pandemic.

Before Junior Eurovision 

On 12 October 2021, MRT announced that a group of children from the television series  will represent the country in the Junior Eurovision Song Contest 2021. The selected song "Green Forces" was composed by Robert Bilbilov and Robin Zimbakov, and was released on November 12.

Artist and song information

Dajte Muzika 

Dajte Muzika is a group from the Macedonian TV program of the same name that represented North Macedonia at the Junior Eurovision Song Contest 2021 in Paris, France.

Green Forces 

"Green Forces" is a song by Dajte Muzika, written by Robert Bilbilov and Robin Zimbakov. It represented North Macedonia at the Junior Eurovision Song Contest 2021 in Paris, France. The song was released on 12 November, 2021.

At Junior Eurovision
After the opening ceremony, which took place on 13 December 2021, it was announced that North Macedonia would perform eighteenth on 19 December 2021, following Serbia and preceding Portugal.

At the end of the contest, North Macedonia received 114 points, placing 9th out of 19 participating countries.

Voting

Detailed voting results

References

North Macedonia
2021
Junior Eurovision Song Contest